Jere Juhani Karalahti (born 25 March 1975) is a Finnish former professional ice hockey defenceman. He was drafted by the Los Angeles Kings as their sixth-round pick in the 1993 NHL Entry Draft and played a total of 166 games in the NHL. Karalahti won the 1998 Liiga championship in his native Finland, he is a three-time silver medalist at World Championships and also won one bronze with the Finnish national team. His playing career included stints in Finland, the US, Germany, Belarus and Sweden.

Playing career

Early career in Finland
Karalahti played in the 1989 Quebec International Pee-Wee Hockey Tournament with youth ice hockey team from Helsinki.

Karalahti played his first major ice hockey games for HIFK during the 1993–94 SM-liiga season. Karalahti was soon seen as a good physical defenceman and he began to have more ice time season by season. Karalahti's best SM-liiga moment came in 1998 when HIFK won the SM-liiga championship over Ilves. Karalahti played a good season, posting a career high in points (30pts). Karalahti improved his record by three points in the following season and was offered a contract by the NHL club the Los Angeles Kings.

NHL
Karalahti moved to North America in 1999 after difficulties with his visa, playing the rest of the season for the LA Kings. After a good first season, Karalahti's time on ice was reduced and he eventually requested a trade to the Nashville Predators, which he got in 2001. In the summer of 2002 Karalahti was suspended for six months by the NHL for a drug violation, and he returned to Finland.

Return to Finland
Upon returning to the SM-liiga, Karalahti resumed his role as one of HIFK's premier defensemen. Head coach Doug Shedden made Karalahti team captain for the 2005–06 season, but he lost most of the season due to injuries. At the close of the season, Karalahti stirred up controversy by refusing to play in the bronze medal game for the second time in his HIFK career, citing a lack of interest. He was subsequently stripped of his captaincy. Karalahti's contract was not renewed by HIFK and he left the club he had been representing his entire career in Finland.

Karalahti was approached by several European teams including Jokerit and Kölner Haie but he chose Oulun Kärpät, a Northern Finland team which had rapidly risen to the Finnish Ice Hockey Elite. During his debut season Karalahti returned to his own level as the leading defenceman of Kärpät. Karalahti was released from Kärpät after he was arrested by Finnish police and taken into custody.

Later career
After being a free agent for some time Karalahti was approached by HC Slovan Bratislava, a top Slovakian side which is the current Slovakian League champion. Karalahti's move to Bratislava came to jeopardy when the transfer fell through because of a missing signature in the transfer documents. Juuso Pulliainen, Karalahti's agent, assured that both the Slovakian Ice Hockey Administration and Finnish Ice Hockey Administration had agreed that Karalahti's rights are owned by Slovan, hence meaning he could play for Slovan. However, Karalahti stated that he wanted to clear things in Finland before rushing into anything.

On 24 July 2008 Jere Karalahti signed a contract with the Germany Elite League Club Hamburg Freezers in Germany for the 2008–09 season.

In May 2009, Karalahti announced that he would leave Hamburg to play for HC Neftekhimik Nizhnekamsk in the Russian Kontinental Hockey League. However, only a few weeks later he changed his mind and decided to re-sign with the Freezers instead.

For the 2011-2012 and 2012–13 seasons, Karalahti joined Dinamo Minsk in the Kontinental Hockey League (KHL), where he also became captain. In 2013, he returned to Helsinki to play for Jokerit in the Liiga and the KHL.

In November 2014 Karalahti signed a contract with HV71 in the Swedish Hockey League for the 2014–15 and the 2015–16 seasons. He announced his retirement in August 2016.

Substance abuse
In a 21 January 2002 interview with Sports Illustrated Karalahti detailed his history of drug use, which included an arrest in 1996 for possession of various quantities of marijuana, amphetamines and heroin that resulted in a brief suspension by the SM-liiga. He told the magazine that he had been drug-free for five years. Nevertheless, on August 16 of that year, the NHL suspended him for six months for his third violation of the league's substance abuse policy. However, this time the violation involved alcohol, not drugs. Following the suspension, Karalahti returned to Finland.
 
His NHL suspension resulted in him being unable to compete in the 2004 World Cup of Hockey.

For the 2007–08 season, Karalahti signed a contract with Oulun Kärpät, the then SM-liiga champion. This was his first time playing for any other Finnish team than his 'home team', Helsinki IFK. It was speculated that he would attempt a comeback in the NHL, and with this in mind had set a very strict contract with Kärpät that allowed no drug abuse and included regular check-ups with the team doctor.

On 6 November 2007 Finnish police came to an Oulun Kärpät practice session and took Jere Karalahti away for questioning. He was later transferred to Espoo where he was heard about his further involvement in a drug ring. The Espoo district court arrested him for suspicion of a gross drug felony.

On 12 December 2007 he was released from his contract with Kärpät.

On 29 January 2008 he was charged with smuggling 9 lbs (4.09 kg) of amphetamines into Finland. He also allegedly provided €20,000 (US$29,000) for smuggling operations, the prosecutor said. He has denied all charges. The drug ring is suspected of smuggling about 20 kilograms of amphetamines and hundreds of grams of cocaine from Estonia to Finland last year. The charges carried a maximum penalty of up to six years in prison. Karalahti was convicted and given a 20-month suspended sentence. Both Karalahti and the prosecution say they will appeal.

On 20 March 2008, in Espoo District Court, Jere Karalahti was put on probation for 20 months and also fined €10,000.

Awards
 SM-liiga, Kanada-malja (1): 1997–98
 SM-liiga (2): 1998–99, 2010–11
 SM-liiga (1): 2003-04

Career statistics

Regular season and playoffs

International

References

External links
 
 Jatkoaika.com player profile (in Finnish)
 Die spinnen, die Finnen! Freezers-Star Karalahti für tot erklärt

1975 births
Finnish ice hockey defencemen
Hamburg Freezers players
HC Dinamo Minsk players
Espoo Blues players
HIFK (ice hockey) players
HV71 players
Jokerit players
Oulun Kärpät players
Living people
Long Beach Ice Dogs (IHL) players
Los Angeles Kings draft picks
Los Angeles Kings players
Nashville Predators players
Ice hockey people from Helsinki